VF-84, Fighter Squadron 84 was an aviation unit of the United States Navy. Originally established as VA-86 on 1 July  1955, it was immediately redesignated as VF-84 and was disestablished on 1 October 1995. It was the third US Navy squadron to be designated as VF-84. The squadron was nicknamed the Jolly Rogers and was based at NAS Oceana.  It took the number but not the lineage of VF-84 the "Wolf Gang" and the insignia of VF-61 the Jolly Rogers.

Related squadrons
Five distinct U.S. Naval Aviation squadrons have used either the designation VF-84 or the name and insignia of the Jolly Roger: VF-17/VF-5B/VF-61 Jolly Rogers, VF-84 (1953-5), VF-84 Vagabonds/Jolly Rogers, and VF-103/VFA-103 Jolly Rogers.  These are all distinctly different squadrons that have no lineal linkage.  Three of these squadrons have used the Jolly Roger name, the skull and crossbones insignia and traditions at various times.  The VF-84 Jolly Rogers (1955–95) are the main topic of this article. After the disestablishment of VF-84 in 1995, VF-103 Sluggers changed their squadron's name and insignia to that of the Jolly Rogers.

Operational history

The third VF-84, initially known as the Vagabonds, was established on July 1, 1955, at NAS Oceana flying the FJ-3 Fury. After deactivation of VF-61 in 1959, VF-84's commanding officer, formerly with VF-61, requested to change his squadron's name and insignia to that of the Jolly Rogers. His request was approved on April 1, 1960.

The squadron transitioned to the F8U-2 Crusader in 1959.

VF-84 deployed aboard Independence during the Cuban Missile Crisis and the Bay of Pigs incident, the squadron made several Mediterranean cruises on board the Independence. The squadron flew the F-8C Crusaders for several years prior to being introduced to the F-4B during 1964.

In 1964, VF-84 transitioned to the F-4 Phantom II and flew the F-4B, F-4J and the F-4N until they transitioned to the F-14 Tomcat in early 1976. In 1965 the squadron deployed for 7 months on board Independence in the Gulf of Tonkin and flew 1507 combat sorties, logging 2200 flight hours over both North Vietnam and South Vietnam.

Roosevelt'''s twenty-first Sixth Fleet deployment was marked by indirect participation in the October 1973 Yom Kippur War, as she served as a transit "landing field" for aircraft being delivered to Israel. The Roosevelt battlegroup, Task Force 60.2, also stood by for possible evacuation contingencies. Planes of VF-84 (temporarily assigned to VF-41 for the 1973-74 cruise and operating with VF-41 markings) escorted US transport planes to within 150 miles of Israel during Operation Nickel Grass, the resupply of Israel.

After its transition to the F-14 was completed, the squadron embarked on its first cruise on Nimitz in December 1977. In 1979 the unit was the first TARPS capable squadron of the fleet. In 1980 it participated in the motion picture The Final Countdown which propelled the skull-and-crossbones-adorned F-14's to international stardom. The movie featured a memorable scene involving two VF-84 Tomcats engaging two Japanese A6M Zeros.

In January 1980, Nimitz diverted from the Mediterranean to take up station in the Arabian Sea in response to the Iranian hostage crisis and in April participated in the failed hostage rescue attempt. In November 1983, the squadron embarked on an extended deployment off the coast of Beirut, Lebanon, in support of a multinational peacekeeping force. During 1985, VF-84 spent 68 days off the coast of Lebanon in response to the hijacking of TWA Flight 847.

The squadron's last cruise with Nimitz lasted from December 1986 until June 1987, when Nimitz was rebased to Bremerton, WA. In October 1988, CVW-8 (the carrier wing of which VF-84 was a part) was deployed with Theodore Roosevelt, beginning in the North Atlantic for Exercise Teamwork '88 which involved operations with the Royal Norwegian Air Force. Roosevelt's first Mediterranean deployment was in December.  VF-84 also did Shakedown and initial carrier qualifications for the USS Lincoln in late 1989-1990.

In December 1990, Theodore Roosevelt deployed as the last carrier to join the Operation Desert Shield force.  "TR" joined Ranger and Midway in the Persian Gulf and was later joined by America. Throughout the Gulf War, VF-84 flew combat air patrols for the fleet, escorting the Air Wing Eight’s strike aircraft and performing TARPS missions to collect bomb damage assessments. In total, squadron members flew 468 combat sorties. After the war, VF-84 flew an additional 111 sorties in support of Operation Provide Comfort before Roosevelt was relieved by Forrestal in June 1991.

In March 1993, VF-84 deployed again on Theodore Roosevelt, the only F-14 squadron in a reconfigured airwing that included Marine F/A-18, CH-53 and UH-1 squadrons. VF-84 flew critical TARPS reconnaissance missions during Operation Deny Flight, providing information about Bosnian Serb positions around Sarajevo. The squadron also flew in support of Operation Southern Watch, enforcing the no-fly zone over southern Iraq. VF-84 returned to NAS Oceana in September 1993. It was to be the squadron's last Mediterranean deployment.

Due to the downsizing of the Navy after the Cold War, the Navy disestablished several squadrons, and VF-84 was one of them. The squadron spent its last eighteen months of existence participating in several joint service operations, honing its skills in air-to-air combat, strike and TARPS. The squadron also made another memorable appearance in another motion picture, Executive Decision. VF-84 was disestablished on October 1, 1995, but VF-103 Sluggers adopted the name and insignia of the Jolly Rogers. From its transition to the F-14 until its disestablishment, VF-84 had been a part of CVW-8.

Popular culture

The markings of Roy Focker's VF-1S Valkyrie (which was itself inspired by the F-14 Tomcat) in The Super Dimension Fortress Macross is obviously inspired by the squadron insignia of VF-84, and his "Skull Squadron" is considered the equivalent of VF-84; in the Americanized version, Robotech, the squadron was also considered to be elite. In the movie Macross: Do You Remember Love this is even more apparent, as the skull-and-crossbones insignia is worn by all Valkyries in Skull Squadron. This painting scheme has continued to be reproduced in both the prequel series Macross Zero (2002), on Focker's VF-0S experimental Valkyrie, and more recently Macross Frontier (2008), where the pilot Ozma Lee, as the senior leader of Skull Squadron, has the markings on his VF-25S.
VF-84 plays a predominant role in The Final CountdownVF-84 Tomcats appear in a brief scene in The Philadelphia ExperimentA Jolly Rogers squadron is featured in Executive Decision film.
VF-84 is one of two squadrons that help dismantle the Soviet fighter force based on Iceland in Tom Clancy's novel Red Storm RisingSee also

History of the United States Navy
List of inactive United States Navy aircraft squadrons
List of United States Navy aircraft squadrons

References

Further reading
Tony Holmes (2005). US Navy F-14 Tomcat Units of Operation Iraqi Freedom, Osprey Publishing Limited.
Tom Blackburn, The Jolly Rogers'' (Orion Books, 1989)

External links
The Jolly Rogers Squadron: Past and Present
Almansur's Unofficial History of the Jolly Rogers
VF-84 History

VFA-84
Military units and formations in Virginia